Medical Story is an American anthology series that aired on NBC from September 4, 1975, until January 8, 1976.

Premise
This was an anthology series about issues in the medical field, making it into the medical equivalent of Police Story.

Notable guest stars
(in alphabetical order)
Diane Baker
Richard Basehart
Ralph Bellamy
Theodore Bikel
Beau Bridges
Dane Clark
Dabney Coleman
Broderick Crawford
Bradford Dillman
Howard Duff
Vince Edwards
Shelley Fabares
John Forsythe
Ruth Gordon
Farley Granger
Judd Hirsch
Marsha Hunt
Shirley Knight
Hope Lange
Juliet Mills
Arthur O'Connell
Linda Purl
Carl Reiner
Pernell Roberts
Ann Sothern
Susan Strasberg
Joan Van Ark

Episodes

References

External links
Medical Story at CVTA link with episode list

1975 American television series debuts
1976 American television series endings
1970s American anthology television series
1970s American medical television series
English-language television shows
NBC original programming
Television series by Sony Pictures Television
Television shows set in Oregon